Battle of Zhangjiawan or Battle of Chang-kia-wan was fought by British and French forces against China at the town of Zhangjiawan (to the east of Tongzhou) during the Second Opium War on the morning of 18 September 1860.

Battle 
The combined Anglo-French force which had recently occupied Tianjin engaged a Chinese army numbering some 30,000-strong at Zhangjiawan. British cavalry won a battle against Mongolian cavalry, French infantry crushed the defence of Chinese troops, and British-French artillery inflicting massive losses on the Chinese Qing army.

Aftermath 
Since infantry was the worst part of the Qing army, the Qing commander-in-chief Sengge Rinchen decided to use his cavalry against the Anglo-French forces. The Battle of Palikao took place three days later.

References

Further reading 
Walrond, Theodore, ed. (1872). Letters and Journals of James, Eighth Earl of Elgin. London: John Murray. pp. 355–358.

1860 in China
Battles of the Second Opium War
Battles involving France
Battles involving the United Kingdom
Conflicts in 1860
Zhangjiawan
September 1860 events